Leopold John Genn (9 August 190526 January 1978) was an English actor and barrister. Distinguished by his relaxed charm and smooth, "black velvet" voice, he had a lengthy career in theatre, film, television, and radio; often playing aristocratic or gentlemanly, sophisticate roles. 

Born to a Jewish family in London, Genn was educated as a lawyer and was a practicing barrister until after World War II, in which he served in the Royal Artillery as a Lieutenant-Colonel. He began his acting career at The Old Vic and made his film debut in 1935, starring in a total of 85 screen roles until his death in 1978. For his portrayal of Petronius in the 1951 Hollywood epic Quo Vadis, he received an Oscar nomination for Best Supporting Actor.

Early life and family
Genn was born at 144 Kyverdale Road, Stamford Hill, Hackney, London, the son of Jewish parents Woolfe (William) Genn and Rachel Genn (née Asserson).

Genn attended the City of London School, having gained scholarships in both classics and mathematics, and studied law at St Catharine's College, Cambridge, where he became captain of both the football and tennis teams. He went on to study at the Middle Temple, qualifying as a barrister in 1928. He finally ceased practising as a lawyer after serving as an assistant prosecutor at the Belsen War Trials.

Career

Theatre career
Genn originally entered acting, with the Berkley Players (attached to the West London Synagogue), in order to increase his chances of finding prospective clients for his legal work. Actor/manager Leon Lion saw Genn act and offered him a contract. Genn's theatrical debut was in 1930 in A Marriage has been Disarranged at the Devonshire Park Theatre, Eastbourne and then at the Royalty Theatre in Dean Street, London. Lion had engaged him simultaneously as an actor and attorney. In 1933 he appeared in Ballerina by Rodney Ackland. Between September 1934 and March 1936, Leo Genn was a member of the Old Vic Company where he appeared in many productions of Shakespeare. In 1934 he featured in R. J. Minney's Clive of India. 

In 1937 he was Horatio in Tyrone Guthrie's production of Hamlet, with Laurence Olivier as Hamlet, in Elsinore, Denmark. In 1938 Genn appeared in the theatrical hit The Flashing Stream by Charles Langbridge Morgan and went with the show to America and Broadway. His many other stage performances included Lillian Hellman's Another Part of the Forest, 12 Angry Men, The Devil's Advocate, and Somerset Maugham's The Sacred Flame.

In 1959 Genn gave a reading in Chichester Cathedral. In 1974, a recording of The Jungle Book was released with Genn as narrator and Miklós Rózsa conducting the Frankenland Symphony Orchestra with the music from the film.

Film career

Genn's first film role was as Shylock in Immortal Gentleman (1935), a biography of Shakespeare. Douglas Fairbanks Jr hired Genn as a technical adviser on the film Accused (1936). He was subsequently given a small part in the film on the strength of a "splendid voice and presence". Genn received another small role in Alexander Korda's The Drum (1938) and was the young man who danced with Eliza Doolittle at the duchess's ball in Pygmalion, a film made in the same year, although he was uncredited.

War service
With war approaching, Genn joined the Officers' Emergency Reserve in 1938. He was commissioned in the Royal Artillery on 6 July 1940 and was promoted to lieutenant-colonel in 1943. In 1944 the actor was given official leave to appear as Charles I d'Albret, the Constable of France, in Laurence Olivier's Henry V.

Genn was awarded the Croix de Guerre in 1945. He was part of the British unit that investigated war crimes at Belsen concentration camp and later was an assistant prosecutor at the Belsen war crimes trials in Lüneburg, Germany.

Post-war

He was in Green for Danger (1946) and The Snake Pit (1948). He was one of the two leading actors in The Wooden Horse in 1950. After his Oscar-nominated success as Petronius in Quo Vadis (1951), he appeared in John Huston's Moby Dick (1956). Genn also appeared in some  American films, such as The Girls of Pleasure Island, and Plymouth Adventure (1952), a fictionalised treatment of the Pilgrims' landing at Plymouth Rock. He later starred opposite Gene Tierney in the British film Personal Affair (1953).

He played Major Michael Pemberton in Roberto Rossellini's Era Notte a Roma (Escape by Night, 1960). Leo Genn narrated the coronation programmes of both 1937 and 1953, the King George VI Memorial Programme in 1952, and the United Nations ceremonial opening (in the USA) in 1947.

Genn was a governor of the Mermaid Theatre and trustee of the Yvonne Arnaud Theatre. He was also council member of the Arts Educational Trust. He was appointed distinguished visiting professor of theatre arts, Pennsylvania State University, 1968 and visiting professor of drama, University of Utah, 1969.

Personal life 
On 14 May 1933, Genn married Marguerite van Praag, a casting director at Ealing Studios. They had no children.

Death
Genn died in London on 26 January 1978. The immediate cause of death was a heart attack, brought on by complications of pneumonia.

He is buried in Etretat Churchyard, Seine-Maritime, France.

Selected filmography

1935: Immortal Gentleman as Merchant / Shylock
1936: The Dream Doctor as Husband
1936: Rhodes of Africa as Narrator (voice, uncredited)
1936: Accused as Man (uncredited)
1937: The Cavalier of the Streets as Attorney General
1937: Jump for Glory as Prosecuting Counsel
1937: The Rat as Defending Counsel
1938: Pygmalion as Prince (uncredited)
1938: The Drum as Abdul Fakir (uncredited)
1938: Kate Plus Ten as Dr. Gurdon
1938: Dangerous Medicine as Murdoch
1940: Contraband as First Brother Grimm
1940: Ten Days in Paris as Lanson
1940: The Girl in the News as Prosecuting Counsel (uncredited)
1940: Law and Order as Another Agent
1942: The Young Mr. Pitt as Danton (uncredited)
1943: The Bells Go Down as Off-Screen Narrator (uncredited)
1944: The Way Ahead as Capt. Edwards
1944: Tunisian Victory as Narrator (voice)
1944: The Return of the Vikings as Narrator (voice)
1944: Henry V as The Constable of France
1945: Caesar and Cleopatra as Bel Affris
1947: Green for Danger as Mr. Eden
1947: Mourning Becomes Electra as Adam Brant
1948: The Velvet Touch as Michael Morrell
1948: London Belongs to Me as Narrator, introduction (uncredited)
1948: The Snake Pit as Dr. Mark Kik
1950: No Place for Jennifer as William Bailey
1950: I Went Back documentary with Leo Genn and as narrator
1950: The Wooden Horse as Peter
1950: The Miniver Story as Steve Brunswick
1951: Quo Vadis as Petronius
1951: The Magic Box as Maida Vale Doctor
1952: 24 Hours of a Woman's Life as Robert Stirling
1952: Plymouth Adventure as William Bradford
1953  The Coronation Ceremony, documentary as Narrator
1953  Elizabeth Is Queen, Coronation documentary as Narrator
1953: The Girls of Pleasure Island as Roger Halyard
1953: The Red Beret as Major Snow
1953: Personal Affair as Stephen Barlow
1954: The Green Scarf as Rodelec
1955: Chantage as Lionel Kendall
1955: Lady Chatterley's Lover as Sir Clifford Chatterley
1956: Moby Dick as Starbuck
1956: Beyond Mombasa as Ralph Hoyt
1957: The Steel Bayonet as Maj. Alan Gerrard
1958: Lambeth 1958 documentary directed by Raymond Kinsey, narrated By Leo Genn
1958: I Accuse! as Maj. Picquart
1958: No Time to Die as Sgt. Kendall
1960: Too Hot to Handle as Johnny Solo
1960: Era Notte a Roma as British Major Michael Pemberton
1962: The Longest Day as Major-General Hollander at SHAEF
1962  Nothing to Eat (But Food) (narrator, documentary)
1963: 55 Days at Peking as Gen. Jung-Lu
1964: The Delhi Way (narrator, documentary)
1964: The Secret of Dr. Mabuse as Adm. Quency
1965: Ten Little Indians as General Mandrake
1966: Circus of Fear as Elliott
1966: Khartoum as Narrator (uncredited)
1970: The Bloody Judge as Lord Wessex
1970: Connecting Rooms as Dr. Norman
1971: National Trust as Narrator
1971: Lizard in a Woman's Skin as Edmond Brighton
1971: Die Screaming, Marianne as The Judge
1972: Endless Night as Psychiatrist (uncredited)
1973:  as Chief of M.I.5
1973: The Mackintosh Man as Rollins (uncredited)
1974: Frightmare as Dr. Lytell
1975:  as Henryk Goldszmit vel Janusz Korczak (final film role)

Theatre
 1930 A Marriage Has Been Disarranged, Devonshire Park Theatre, Eastbourne, Royalty Theatre
 appearances in: No 17; Tiger Cats; Champion North; While Parents Sleep; Clive of India 1931 O.H.M.S.
 1934–36 Old Vic Company:
 1934–35 Old Vic Season
 Much Ado About Nothing
 Henry IV Part 2
 Major Barbara
 Hippolytus by Euripides
 The Two Shepherds by Sierra
 Othello
 The Taming of the Shrew, Sadler's Wells
 Saint Joan, Old Vic/Sadler's Wells
 Richard II
 Antony and Cleopatra
 Hamlet
 Shakespeare Birthday Festival- 23 April 1935
Last Night of Shakespeare Season: scenes from Hamlet, Richard II, Taming of The Shrew, 20 May 1935
 1935–36 Old Vic Season
 Julius Caesar
 Macbeth
 Richard III
 King Lear
 Saint Helena by R.C. Sherriff
 Peer Gynt
 The School for Scandal
1936–37 Old Vic Season
 Twelfth Night
 Henry V
1937–69 Later Work
 1937 Shakespeare Birthday Festival: excerpts from Shakespeare, 23 April 1937, Old Vic
 1937 Hamlet, as Horatio, at Elsinore
 1938 Shakespeare Birthday Festival: excerpts from Shakespeare, 25 April 1938, Old Vic
 1938 The Flashing Stream, Lyric Theatre & New York 1939
 1940 The Jersey Lily by Basil Bartlett, Gate Theatre Studio
 1946 Another Part of the Forest, New York
 1948 Jonathan by Alan Melville, Aldwych
 1951 The Seventh Veil, Prince's Theatre
 1953 Henry VIII, as Buckingham, with Paul Rogers as Henry VIII, Old Vic. A Coronation Gala performance, held on 6 May 1953, in the presence of the Queen.
 1954 The Bombshell, Westminster Theatre
 1957 Small War on Murray Hill, New York
 1959 The Hidden River, Cambridge Theatre
 1961 The Devil's Advocate, New York
 1964 Fair Game for Lovers, Cort Theatre, New York
 1964 12 Angry Men, Queen's Theatre
 1967 The Sacred Flame, Duke of York's Theatre
 1968 The Only Game in Town, New York
 1968 Caesar and Cleopatra, US
 1969 Doctor Faustus, US

Television
 1955 Omnibus: "Herod"
 1955 Screen Director's Playhouse: "Titanic Incident"
 1960 Mrs. Miniver with Maureen O'Hara as Mrs Miniver and Leo Genn as Clem Miniver, CBS
 1961 The Defenders
 1961 The Jack Paar Show, (himself)
 1961 The Life of Adolf Hitler written & directed by Paul Rotha, commentary by Leo Genn & Marius Goring
 1962 The Unseen Valley directed by Stephen Peet, Royal Commonwealth Society for the Blind, BBC
 1962 An Act of Faith, a BBC documentary on Coventry Cathedral, narrated by Leo Genn
 1963 Bob Hope Presents The Chrysler Theatre: "Commander Tony Gardiner"
 1963 The Merv Griffin Show, (himself)
 1964 "The Thirty Days of Gavin Heath", an episode of The Virginian, Leo Genn as Gavin Heath
 1965 The Cat's Cradle by Hugo Charteris, an instalment of The Wednesday Play, BBC Television
 1967 Saint Joan
 1969 Strange Report
 1969  The Expert
 1970 Howards End (with Glenda Jackson), an instalment of Play of the Month BBC Television
 1971 The Persuaders! "The Long Goodbye"
 1973 The Movie Quiz
 1973 Jackanory, narrating on three episodes 
 1974 The Zoo Gang

Radio
 1935 Penarth's Cave, a play and competition by J. Harold Carpenter, The Children's Hour BBC
 1936 Kitchener, BBC radio
 1937 The Company of Heaven, devised for Michaelmas by R. Ellis Roberts with music by Benjamin Britten 
 1939 Morte d'Arthur by Alfred, Lord Tennyson
 1945 The Man of Property, Young Jolyon in Muriel Levy's adaptation of the first novel in John Galsworthy's Forsyte Saga sequence, broadcast by BBC radio in half-hourly episodes
 1946 The Voyage of Magellan OF MAGELLAN', a dramatic chronicle in verse by Laurie Lee
 1952 Deburau by Sacha Guitry, adapted by Dennis Arundell from the English version by Harley Granville-Barker 
 1953 Desert Island Discs, BBC, guest, (broadcast 26 June 1953).
 1954 Dear Brutus by J. M. Barrie, BBC 
 1954 Jungle Green dramatised & produced by Alan Burgess from the book by Arthur Campbell, BBC
 1961 No Summer at Sea by Philip Holland BBC 
 1962 The Lark by Jean Anouilh, translated by Christopher Fry, BBC 
 1963 The Enemy Below by Denys Rayner, BBC radio
 1965 The Skin Game, by John Galsworthy, BBC radio
 1966 Ashenden – Secret Agent 1914-1918: The Hairless Mexican, by W. Somerset Maugham, in five episodes, adapted by Howard Agg, produced by George Angell and read by Leo Genn.
 1967 Ashenden – Secret Agent 1914-1918: Giulia Lazzari, by  W. Somerset Maugham, in five episodes, adapted by Howard Agg, produced by George Angell and read by Leo Genn.

References

External links

 
 Performances by Leo Genn, bris.ac.uk. Retrieved 25 April 2016.
 

1905 births
1978 deaths
Alumni of St Catharine's College, Cambridge
British Army personnel of World War II
Male actors from London
People educated at the City of London School
People from Stamford Hill
Recipients of the Croix de Guerre 1939–1945 (France)
Royal Artillery officers
20th-century English male actors
Jewish English male actors
Deaths from pneumonia in England
Burials in Etretat Churchyard